Virgile Jacky Marcel Pinson (born 22 February 1996) is a French professional footballer who plays as a forward for Liga I club FC Botoșani.

Career
Pinson is a youth product of Le Havre, joining them at 12 and playing with their youth academy for six years.

Reims
On 23 April 2018, Pinson joined Reims from Antalyaspor. He made his professional debut with Reims in a 1–0 Ligue 1 loss to HSC Montpellier on 1 September 2018.

Quevilly-Rouen
Pinson joined Quevilly-Rouen at the end of September 2020, after being released by Reims.

Lokomotiv Sofia
On 7 September 2021, Pinson agreed to a two-year deal at Lokomotiv Sofia.

Botoșani
On 20 September 2022, Pinson agreed to a two-year deal at Botoșani.

Personal life
Born in France, Pinson is of Cameroonian descent.

References

External links
 

1996 births
Living people
Sportspeople from Gironde
French footballers
French sportspeople of Cameroonian descent
Association football forwards
Stade de Reims players
Antalyaspor footballers
Limoges FC players
K.V. Woluwe-Zaventem players
US Quevilly-Rouen Métropole players
FC Botoșani players
Ligue 1 players
Belgian Third Division players
Championnat National players
Championnat National 2 players
Championnat National 3 players
Liga I players
French expatriate footballers
French expatriate sportspeople in Turkey
French expatriate sportspeople in Belgium
French expatriate sportspeople in Romania
Expatriate footballers in Turkey
Expatriate footballers in Belgium
Expatriate footballers in Romania
Footballers from Nouvelle-Aquitaine